Wang Baochuan and Xue Pinggui, also known by many other names such as The Red-Maned Stallion, Wujiapo, Returning to the Cave, and The Story of the Colourful Tower, is a Chinese legend commonly played out in Chinese opera theatres. The story takes place in the Tang dynasty, supposedly during Emperor Xuanzong of Tang (9th century)'s reign, but is otherwise completely fictional. 

The story is known in the west as Lady Precious Stream ("Precious Stream" is a loose translation of the female protagonist's given name, Baochuan), which was adapted to western theatre by Hsiung Shih-I. It was performed at the Little Theatre in John Street, London, by the People's National Theatre, directed by Nancy Price and Hsiung, and ran for 1,000 nights. The play was also later performed on Broadway at the Booth Theatre in New York, produced by Morris Gest.

Film and TV adaptations
Wang Baochuan, a 1939 Chinese film
Lady Precious Stream, a 1950 English TV film
The Story of Sit Ping-kwai and Wong Bo-chuen, a 1956 Taiwanese film
The Story of Wong Bo-Chuan, a 1959 Hong Kong film
The Story of Ping Gui, a 1967 Taiwanese film
Wang Baochuan and Xue Pinggui, a 1999 Taiwanese TV series
Love Amongst War, a 2012 Chinese TV series

References

Chinese operas
Fictional duos
Tang dynasty in fiction
Chinese folklore
Love stories